Karsspor is a Turkish football club based in the eastern city of Kars and playing in the Regional Amateur League.

The team and its fans are referenced several times in the novel Snow by Orhan Pamuk.

External links
 Karsspor Match Results, 2008/2009 season

Football clubs in Turkey
Kars